The Curry Hill Plantation near Bainbridge, Georgia is a plantation begun in 1842 by Duncan Curry.  It was several thousand acres in size, and was a stage coach stop on the stage coach line between Thomasville and Bainbridge.  The Curry family lived in a log house at first, then in the 1850s lived in the former stage coach house while the main plantation house which stands today was built.  The main house was built in the 1850s and includes Greek Revival elements.

It was listed on the National Register of Historic Places in 1973.

References

Houses on the National Register of Historic Places in Georgia (U.S. state)
Houses completed in 1842
National Register of Historic Places in Decatur County, Georgia
Plantations in Georgia (U.S. state)